The Plymouth Life Centre is a leisure centre in Central Park, Plymouth run by Plymouth Active (Previously Everyone Active) in partnership with Plymouth City Council. Its facilities include a family leisure pool, a climbing wall, an eight-lane indoor bowls centre, fitness suite, a 10 lane 50-metre Olympic standard swimming pool, an Olympic standard diving pool, along with dryside training facilities, showers and a multipurpose area for dance and martial arts. It is currently the only 12 court multipurpose sports hall in Devon. The climbing wall facility is managed by High Sports. The aquatic facilities are the largest facility in southern England and were used by several teams training for the 2012 Olympics. The Life Centre replaces the Mayflower Centre and Central Park Leisure Pools. It opened in March 2012 at a cost of £46.5m.

The Life Centre hosted the 2015 British Diving Championships, where local diver World Champion and Olympian Tom Daley won the British title on the 10m platform.

Following the announcement that gyms and leisure centres could open on 25 July 2020, after the UK's first national lockdown amidst the COVID-19 pandemic, Plymouth City Council announced that following investigations by themselves and the contractors, Balfour Beatty, urgent repair work needed to be done to the building. This would include stripping the pool and changing rooms back to the base concrete and laying new waterproof layers. The Life Centre subsequently closed and would do so until April 2021 whilst work was undertaken. Due to the UK Government's road map out of the country's third lockdown, the Life Centre would not reopen to the public until 17 May 2021.

Clubs

The centre is home to the Plymouth Life Centre Indoor Bowls Club, and to Plymouth Diving Club.

Sporting records

Ben Proud set the British 50 m freestyle record at Plymouth Life Centre in May 2014.

Television appearances

Lotto: 2013.

Splash: 2014

The 2015 British Gas Diving Championships (British Diving Championships)

Architecture

The main contractor was Balfour Beatty, and the Architect was Archial.

Usage

The centre has won several awards:
Built in Quality Awards Awards, 2013 : 'Best Community Building'
Michelmores Western Morning News Property Awards, 2013: 'Project valued at over £3million'
Institution of Civil Engineers, 2013: 'Major Project of the Year', 2013

Gallery

Architects drawings were released in 2013.

The cladding for the building is glass
using tiles
with stainless steel and staircases.
There is a flume, sauna steam room, showers and drains.
Heating and low carbon technology were used.

References

External links 
 https://web.archive.org/web/20141008135920/http://www.everyoneactive.com/Centre/Plymouth-Life-Centre/72/Home Plymouth Life Centre website retrieved 19 October 2014
About Olympic and 50 m Swimming pools in the UK and Ireland

Bowls in England
Swimming venues in England
Sports venues in Plymouth, Devon